The 1985 Long Beach State 49ers football team represented California State University, Long Beach during the 1985 NCAA Division I-A football season.

Hopes were high as the 49er's returned 15 starters heading into the 1985 season.  They were once again led by senior quarterback Doug Gaynor who passed for 3563 yards a 71.2% completion percentage and 19 TD's.  He returned his entire receiving corps from the previous season including Charles Lockett 69 catches, 949 yards and 10 TD's, Troy Ory (46-554-5), tight end Greg Locy (38-502-0) and running back Mark Templeton (62-500-1).  The rushing attack was led by Martin Sartin who ran for 441 yards and scored 13 total TD's. The Niners also received a strong contribution from Sheldon Gaines who gained a combined 514 yards rushing and receiving along with leading the team as a kick-returner. The defense was led by a strong pass rush from ends Tom Hensley and Chuck Meierbachtol.  Val James led the secondary with 5 interceptions.

The Niners were a "streaky" team in 1985.  They lost their first two games, then reeled off three wins, two losses, three wins and finally two losses.  The highlight of the season was a showdown with Fresno St.  The 49er's were only one game behind the Bulldogs in the PCAA standings for this late-season matchup.  The game was an exciting one, as the 49ers drove down the field in the waning seconds.  A 54-yard field goal attempt sailed wide right and Fresno prevailed 33-31, clinching the conference championship.

Cal State Long Beach competed in the Pacific Coast Athletic Association. The team was led by second-year head coach Mike Sheppard, and played home games at Veterans Stadium adjacent to the campus of Long Beach City College in Long Beach, California. They finished the season with a record of six wins and six losses (6–6, 4–3 PCAA).

Schedule

Roster

Team players in the NFL
The following were selected in the 1986 NFL Draft.

The following finished their Cal State Long Beach career in 1985, were not drafted, but played in the NFL.

Notes

References

Long Beach State
Long Beach State 49ers football seasons
Long Beach State 49ers football